Bronzeville is a historical fiction podcast starring Larenz Tate and Laurence Fishburne and produced by Cinema Gypsy Productions, TateMen Entertainment, and Audio HQ.

Background 
The podcast was produced by Cinema Gypsy Productions, TateMen Entertainment, and Audio HQ. The show is directed by Larenz Tate, Laurence Fishburne, and Kc Wayland. Larenz Tate spoke with Quincy Jones in 2004 when preparing for his role in the movie Ray, which inspired him to dig into Chicago's history and eventually led to the creation of Bronzeville. The first season of the podcast debuted on February 7, 2017 and season two debuted on March 16, 2021. The fist season consisted of 10 episodes. The second season consisted of six episodes. The podcast is a historical fiction story set in 1940s Chicago. The story is based on Black Metropolis. The story is set during a time when radio dramas were popular and the first black radio soap opera, Here Comes Tomorrow, was created in Chicago. The podcast begins by describing 47th and South Park in Bronzeville, Chicago. The show follows the Randolph family and the Copeland family. The show focuses on the underground lottery or the numbers game. According to the Chicago Defender, the podcast has received more than 20 million listens. The podcast has over 50 voice actors and more than 100 characters.

Cast and characters 

 Larenz Tate as Jimmy Tillman
 Laurence Fishburne as Curtis "Eyeball" Randolph
 Tracee Ellis Ross as Anna Randolph
 Omari Hardwick as Jesse Copeland
 Wood Harris as Everett Copeland
 Tika Sumpter as Lisa Copeland
 Lahmard Tate as Zeke Copeland
 Cory Hardrict as Casper Dixon
 Mekhi Phifer
 LeVar Burton
 Lalah Hathaway
 Affion Crockett
 Beth Maitland
 Michael Nouri
 Obba Babatundé
 Rodney Saulsberry
 Lance Reddick
 Fay Hauser
 Kevin Brief

References 

Audio podcasts
2017 podcast debuts
2017 podcast endings
Historical fiction podcasts
Scripted podcasts
American podcasts